The Redhead Express is an American country music band consisting of four sisters: Kendra (lead singer, songwriter and guitarist), Alisa (second lead and baritone singer who plays fiddle and mandolin), LaRae (banjo, dobro and guitar, and sings tenor harmony), and Meghan Walker (bass and tenor harmony).

History 

The Walker sisters are from Palmer, Alaska, where they formed a family band with their three brothers and their parents, which they voted to call "Redhead Express" because most of them are redheads. In 2007, motivated by their love of music, the Walkers decided to sell their belongings, purchase an RV, a trailer, and travel across the contiguous United States to perform. Since then, the Walker family has done hundreds of shows during their tours, including at state and county fairs, and festivals. Gradually, the four sisters became the stars of the group, with their parents taking managerial positions, and their brothers formed a band called the Walker Brothers.

Career 

In 2010, the Redhead Express sought out Grammy-winning record producer Paul Worley, who agreed to work with them, spending four years supervising their artistic development, and is now producing their first country album.

In June 2014, the Redhead Express appeared live on a WCYB-TV newscast, as well as on WSMV-TV, to play one of their songs. Other TV channels that have featured the band include Iowa Public Television and a live interview on KCWI-TV's Great Day morning news show.

In February 2015, the quartet performed at the Lincoln Theatre in Marion, Virginia, for the Song of the Mountains concert series, which is broadcast on over 190 public television channels in the United States; it was their third appearance on that show. The feature-length film Moose - The Movie, released in 2015, includes some of the Redhead Express' songs in the soundtrack.

Discography

Albums 
 Remember Your Roots (2014)
 Covers (2014)
 Covers 2 (2016)

References

External links
 
 Official YouTube Channel
 Official Facebook Page

American country music groups
Musical groups established in 2007
Musical groups from Alaska
People from Matanuska-Susitna Borough, Alaska
Vocal quartets
Sibling quartets